George Edgar Page Sr. (March 19, 1873February 25, 1959) was an American lawyer, judge, and Republican politician from Milwaukee County, Wisconsin.  He was a member of the Wisconsin Senate (1907–1911) and State Assembly (1905–1907), representing the southern quarter of Milwaukee County.

Background
Page was born in the city of Milwaukee on March 19, 1873, and was educated in the public schools of Milwaukee. He continuously resided there. He was elected to the office of justice of the peace for the 17th ward in 1900, but resigned the same year to enter the Law Department of the Columbian University in Washington, D.C. (later George Washington University Law School). Page graduated in 1903 and was admitted to the bar in the same year. He then served as Milwaukee District Court judge for twenty-four years. Page died in a hospital at age 85 in Milwaukee, Wisconsin, on February 25, 1959.

Legislative career
Page was elected to the Assembly in 1904 and as state senator in 1906, receiving 4,250 votes against 2,603 for Anthony Szczerbinski (Democrat) and 2,737 for W. L. Hamann (Social Democrat). He was succeeded by Socialist Gabriel Zophy following the 1910 Socialist sweep of Milwaukee County offices.

References

1873 births
1959 deaths
George Washington University Law School alumni
Wisconsin state court judges
Politicians from Milwaukee
Republican Party Wisconsin state senators
Republican Party members of the Wisconsin State Assembly